Emanuel Ernesto Roggero Otamendi (born November 1, 1964) is a male former field hockey goalkeeper from Argentina. He competed for his native country at two consecutive Summer Olympics, starting in 1988. He succeeded Otto Schmitt as a first choice goalie in the national squad.

During 2013 he coached the Argentina women's national field hockey team replacing Marcelo Garraffo. After less than a year on the job, he resigned and Carlos Retegui was chosen to coach both the women and men's simultaneously.

References

External links
 

1964 births
Living people
Argentine male field hockey players
Field hockey players at the 1988 Summer Olympics
Field hockey players at the 1992 Summer Olympics
Olympic field hockey players of Argentina
Pan American Games gold medalists for Argentina
Pan American Games silver medalists for Argentina
Pan American Games medalists in field hockey
Field hockey players at the 1987 Pan American Games
Field hockey players at the 1991 Pan American Games
1990 Men's Hockey World Cup players
Medalists at the 1987 Pan American Games
Medalists at the 1991 Pan American Games
Medalists at the 1983 Pan American Games
20th-century Argentine people